David Reis (born September 15, 1964) was a Republican member of the Illinois House of Representatives, representing the 108th district from 2005 to 2012 and the 109th District from 2013 to 2019.

Reis grew up and continues to live on his family's fifth-generation family farm near Ste. Marie, Illinois. After working in Chicago as an executive recruiter, he returned to the farm after his father's death in 1990. He served on the board of directors of the Illinois Pork Producers Association from 1997 to 2004. He has a bachelor's degree in agriculture from the University of Illinois College of Agriculture.

During the 2008 Republican Party presidential primaries, Reis worked on behalf of the presidential campaign of former U.S. Senator Fred Thompson as a member of the Illinois statewide steering committee and as a congressional district chair for Illinois's 19th congressional district.

Reis was one of only five Illinois representatives to vote against the Illinois Right to Vote Amendment on its passage in the Illinois House of Representatives. The bill subsequently was passed unanimously in the Illinois Senate, and was approved as a constitutional amendment by the voters of Illinois.

Reis ran for re-election in 2018, but was defeated by Darren Bailey in the Republican primary. Many attributed his defeat because of his vote in favor of overriding Governor Bruce Rauner's veto of a tax increase that had passed the Illinois General Assembly.

References

External links
Representative David Reis (R) 108th District at the Illinois General Assembly
By session: 100th, 99th, 98th, 97th, 96th, 95th, 94th
 

Republican Party members of the Illinois House of Representatives
1964 births
Living people
21st-century American politicians
People from Olney, Illinois